Sillaqaqa (Quechua silla gravel, qaqa rock, "gravel rock", Hispanicized spelling Sillagaga) is a mountain in the Andes of Peru, about  high. It is situated in the Junín Region, Yauli Province, Marcapomacocha District, and in the Lima Region, Huarochirí Province, Chicla District. Sillaqaqa lies southwest of the mountain Pukaqucha, west of the mountain Yuraqqucha, northeast of Llawa P'ukru and east of the mountains Quriqucha  and Anta Q'asa. The peak south of Sillaqaqa is named Inka Kancha.

References

Mountains of Peru
Mountains of Lima Region
Mountains of Junín Region